Shah Viran-e Pain (also Romanized as Shāh Vīrān-e Pā’īn and Shāhvīrān-e Pā’īn; also known as Shāh Vīrān-e Soflá) is a village in Hemmatabad Rural District, in the Central District of Borujerd County, Lorestan Province, Iran. At the 2006 census, its population was 255, in 58 families.

References 

Towns and villages in Borujerd County